Gafanha do Carmo is a village and a civil parish of the municipality of Ílhavo, Portugal. The population in 2011 was 1,526, in an area of 7.05 km2. It is also known as Gafanha do Boi da Gafa.

References

Freguesias of Ílhavo